Ruth Seeger may refer to:

 Ruth Crawford Seeger (1901–1953), American modernist composer
 Ruth Taubert Seeger (1924–2014), American athlete and coach